Touch and Go Records is an American independent record label based in Chicago, Illinois. After its genesis as a handmade fanzine in 1979, it grew into one of the key record labels in the American 1980s underground and alternative rock scenes. Touch & Go carved out a reputation for releasing adventurous noise rock by the likes of Big Black, the Butthole Surfers, and The Jesus Lizard. Touch & Go helped to spearhead the nationwide network of underground bands that formed the pre-Nirvana indie rock scene, and helped preside over the shift from the hardcore punk that then dominated the American underground scene to the more diverse styles of alternative rock emerging at the time.

History
The zine was formed in 1979 in East Lansing, Michigan as Touch and Go magazine, a self-printed fanzine written and produced by Tesco Vee and Dave Stimson. It wasn't until 1981 that it grew into an independent record label. Vee (later front man of The Meatmen) was bored with the punk sounds of the day, and captivated by the emerging hardcore movement in America. Inspired, he put out records by the Necros, The Fix, the Meatmen, and Negative Approach. In 1981, Necros bassist Corey Rusk joined with Tesco to run the label. In 1983, Tesco handed Touch and Go over to Rusk and his wife Lisa when he left Michigan for Washington, D.C. With the label under their ownership, the Rusks hired Terry Tolkin who signed the Butthole Surfers and Virgin Prunes to the label, and also produced the Gods Favorite Dog compilation. Soon the Rusks relocated the label to Chicago, and Touch and Go released material in the mid-'80s to mid-'90s by bands such as the Butthole Surfers, Big Black, the Jesus Lizard, Scratch Acid, the Didjits, Slint, Girls Against Boys and Killdozer, and continued into the new millennium with artists on its roster including Shellac, Yeah Yeah Yeahs, TV on the Radio, Arcwelder, CocoRosie, Ted Leo and the Pharmacists, and the Black Heart Procession. Lisa Rusk left the label after she and Corey divorced. Corey Rusk continues to run the label.

Similarly to some other alternative music labels, Touch and Go pursued a relaxed approach to recording contracts, characterized sometimes by handshake deals providing for a 50–50 split of profits between artist and label after promotion and production costs. In this way, the label built a respected catalog of influential punk and alternative artists, who in turn, appreciated the commitment of Touch and Go. However, following a 1999 legal dispute with the Butthole Surfers, Touch and Go began asking bands to sign a 1-2 page memorandum of intent.

In 2006, Touch and Go celebrated its 25th anniversary. To commemorate this occasion, the label held a three-day block party event at Chicago's Hideout venue on September 8–10, 2006. Several seminal bands, including Big Black, Scratch Acid, the Didjits, Killdozer, Negative Approach, and Man or Astro-man? reunited and performed at the Chicago event.

On February 18, 2009, Corey Rusk announced that Touch and Go would downsize itself. He cited the "current state of the economy" as the reason for shutting down manufacturing and distribution services for many independent labels like Jade Tree, Kill Rock Stars, and Merge Records.

Book

Touch and Go: The Complete Hardcore Punk Zine '79–'83 is a 576-page trade paperback book containing all 22 issues of the Touch and Go zine.

The book consists of the writings of Tesco Vee and Dave Stimson - the founders and designers of the Touch and Go zine - which eventually evolved into Touch and Go Records, owned by Corey Rusk. The book contains many forewords and introductions written by Tesco Vee, Dave Stimson, Steve Miller, Barry Henssler, Henry Rollins, Keith Morris, Peter Davis, Henry Owings, Byron Coley, Corey Rusk, John Brannon and Ian MacKaye.

The zine, which is chronicled in the book, contains early reviews and features on bands like Black Flag, Circle Jerks, Wire, Minor Threat, Teen Idles, The Necros, Gang of Four, among others.

The book was released on June 30, 2010. It was published by Bazillion Points Publishing.

Controversy
Touch and Go's approach to contracts was challenged in a court case started in 1999 by the Butthole Surfers, who purported that Touch and Go was not marketing its previously released material effectively. The band argued that because its contract with the label was of an unspecified duration, the contract could be terminated. Touch and Go argued that according to existing US copyright law, it controlled the copyright to the band's recordings for a minimum of 35 years, based on sec. 203 of the Copyright Act of 1976.

The US Court of Appeals Seventh Circuit ruled in favor of the band, determining that "when a contract is silent as to its length, it is implicit that it can be terminated by either side," and that "allowing terminations under Illinois law does not conflict with sec. 203, but rather is, in fact, in keeping with the intent of sec. 203."

Roster

 !!!
 All the Saints
 Angry Red Planet
 Arcwelder
 Arsenal
 Bedhead (reissued back catalog)
 Big Black
 Big Boys (reissued back catalog compilation)
 Blight
 The Black Heart Procession
 Blonde Redhead
 Brainiac
 Brick Layer Cake
 Butthole Surfers
 Calexico
 Cargo Cult
 Cash Audio
 Chrome (reissued back catalog)
 CocoRosie
 Crystal Antlers
 Daddy Longhead
 The Delta 72
 Didjits
 Die Kreuzen
 Dirty Three
 Don Caballero
 The Effigies
 Enon
 The Ex
 The Fix
 Flour
 The For Carnation
 Girls Against Boys
 Hose (God's Favorite Dog compilation)
 The Jesus Lizard
 Killdozer
 L-Seven 
 Laughing Hyenas
 Lee Harvey Oswald Band
 Low (split single with The Dirty Three)
 Man or Astro-man?
 Monorchid
 Naked Raygun (reissued back catalog)
 Necros
 Negative Approach
 The New Year
 New Wet Kojak
 Nina Nastasia
 Nirvana (split single with The Jesus Lizard)
 No Trend
 Phono-Comb
 P. W. Long
 Pinback
 Polvo
 Quasi
 Rachel's
 Rapeman
 Red Stars Theory
 Rodan
 The Rollins Band 
 Scratch Acid
 Seam
 Shannon Wright
 Shellac
 Silkworm
 Silverfish
 Skull Kontrol
 Slint
 The Standard
 Storm & Stress
 Supersystem
 Tar
 Ted Leo and the Pharmacists
 Three Mile Pilot
 Sally Timms
 TV on the Radio
 Urge Overkill
 Uzeda
 Violent Apathy
 Virgin Prunes
 Wuhling
 Yeah Yeah Yeahs

See also 
 List of record labels
 Quarterstick Records, a sublabel of Touch and Go
 Chicago Record Labels

References

Other sources
 Tupica, Rich: Touch and Go zine feature in City Pulse. July 2010. accessed July 10, 2010

External links

Interview with Corey Rusk (Sept. 5, 2006), Pitchfork Media
The US Court of Appeals Seventh Circuit decision of the case between Touch and Go and the Butthole Surfers

Record labels established in 1979
American independent record labels
Alternative rock record labels
Companies based in Chicago
Post-hardcore record labels
Indie rock record labels